{{Automatic taxobox
| taxon = Prodotiidae
| image = Minioniella heleneae (MNHN-IM-2000-31692).jpeg
| image_caption = Shell of Minioniella heleneae (holotype at MNHN, Paris)
| authority = Kantor, Fedosov, Kosyan, Puillandre, Sorokin, Kano, R. Clark & Bouchet, 2021
| synonyms_ref = 
| synonyms = 
| type_genus=
| type_genus_authority =
| subdivision_ranks = Genera
| subdivision = See text
|display_parents= 3
}}

The Prodotiidae are a taxonomic family of sea snails, often known as whelks.

Genera
 Caducifer Dall, 1904
 Clivipollia Iredale, 1929
 Enzinopsis Iredale, 1940
 Falsilatirus Emerson & Moffitt, 1988
 Minioniella Fraussen & Stahlschmidt, 2016
 Prodotia Dall, 1924
 Speccapollia'' Fraussen & Stahlschmidt, 2016

References

 Kantor, Y.I., Fedosov, A.E., Kosyan, A.R., Puillandre, N., Sorokin, P.A., Kano, Y., Clark, R. & Bouchet, P. (2021). Molecular phylogeny and revised classification of the Buccinoidea (Neogastropoda). Zoological Journal of the Linnean Society. DOI: 10.1093/zoolinnean/zlab031: 1-69.

Buccinoidea